Themba Nhlanganiso Masuku (born 7 July 1950) is a Swazi politician who has served as Deputy Prime Minister of Eswatini since 2018 and as Acting Prime Minister from 13 December 2020 to 16 July 2021. Earlier, he served as Deputy Prime Minister from 2008 until 2013.

Early life

Masuku was born on 7 July 1950. He received his Master of Science degree from the University of Missouri.

Career

In the 1990s, he filled various posts in the government of Swaziland, including Minister for Agriculture and Cooperatives, Minister for Economic Planning and Development, and Minister of Finance from 1996 to 1998. He then worked with the Food and Agriculture Organization of the United Nations, as director of the liaison offices in Geneva and later New York. He was appointed Deputy Prime Minister in 2008 by King Mswati III and served in that position until 2013, when he became the regional administrator for the Shiselweni district.

Masuku returned to his position as Deputy Prime Minister when Prime Minister Ambrose Mandvulo Dlamini presented his cabinet in November 2018. He became acting prime minister after Dlamini's death on 13 December 2020. According to the Constitution of Eswatini, Themba Masuku was supposed to serve as Acting Prime Minister for a maximum period of three months. In June and July 2021, amidst police and army brutality, Masuku was criticized for his handling of the 2021 Eswatini Protests against the monarchy. In a sibaya on 16 July 2021, King Mswati replaced Masuku with Cleopas Dlamini as the new prime minister.

References

1950 births
Prime Ministers of Eswatini
Deputy Prime ministers of Eswatini
Agriculture ministers of Eswatini
Finance Ministers of Eswatini
Food ministers of Eswatini
Planning ministers of Eswatini
Food and Agriculture Organization officials 
Living people
Swazi officials of the United Nations
Swazi politicians
University of Missouri alumni